The British Rail Class 397 Civity is a class of electric multiple unit built by Spanish rolling stock manufacturer CAF for lease to TransPennine Express by Eversholt Rail Group. A total of twelve five-car units were built to operate services on TransPennine North West services between Liverpool Lime Street/ and Edinburgh Waverley/.

TransPennine Express has branded all of their new fleet under the general name Nova, with the Class 397 units branded as Nova 2. The first unit entered service on 30 November 2019.

History
The announcement of new trains was made by FirstGroup when it was confirmed that they would become the next operator of the TransPennine Express franchise from 1 April 2016. In May 2016 it was announced by TransPennine Express that they had ordered 12 five-car electric multiple units from CAF to replace the fleet of ten four-car Class 350/4 Desiro units which previously operated TransPennine Express services between Liverpool, Manchester and Scotland. This train is not equipped with tilting.

Testing of the first set began at the Velim railway test circuit in July 2018.

An option for up to 22 extra units was available to TransPennine Express, but it was not exercised.

Operation 
The Nova 2 was launched officially by TPE at Liverpool Lime Street with other members of the Nova fleet. The first unit entered passenger service on 30 November 2019.

Fleet details

The units were designed as an intercity train. Wi-Fi and seat reservations are also available on the train. These trains were also awarded the Golden Spanner Award for maintenance reliability.

Vehicle numbering
Individual vehicles are numbered in the ranges as follows, with the last three digits of each vehicle number matching those of the unit to which the vehicle belongs:

European Vehicle Numbers for the fleet are devised by prefixing the domestic vehicle number with type code 94, country code 70, and a leading zero; "94700...".

Livery illustration

See also
 British Rail Class 195 - A DMU variant of the CAF Civity UK platform built for Northern.
 British Rail Class 196 - A DMU variant of the CAF Civity UK platform built for West Midlands Trains.
 British Rail Class 197 - A DMU variant of the CAF Civity UK platform built for Transport for Wales Rail.
 British Rail Class 331 - An EMU variant of the CAF Civity UK platform also built for Northern.

References

External links

397
CAF multiple units
Train-related introductions in 2019